José Flabio Torres Sierra (born 7 December 1970) is a Colombian football manager and former player who played as a defender. He is the current manager of Deportivo Pasto.

References

External links

1970 births
Living people
People from Ibagué
Colombian footballers
Association football defenders
Deportivo Cali footballers
Once Caldas footballers
Deportes Tolima footballers
Cúcuta Deportivo footballers
Independiente Santa Fe footballers
Atlético Bello footballers
Atlético Huila footballers
Girardot F.C. footballers
Colombian football managers
Categoría Primera A managers
Deportivo Pasto managers
Once Caldas managers
Cúcuta Deportivo managers
Colombian expatriate football managers
Expatriate football managers in Peru
Colombian expatriate sportspeople in Peru
Águilas Doradas Rionegro managers
Deportivo Binacional FC managers
Atlético Bucaramanga managers